Tingley railway station served the settlement of Tingley, West Yorkshire, England, from 1857 to 1966 on the Leeds, Bradford and Halifax Junction Railway.

History 
The station opened in May 1857 by the Leeds, Bradford and Halifax Junction Railway. It closed on 1 February 1954 to regular passenger traffic but it was still open for excursions. This lasted until July 1966 and the station closed to goods traffic later on in the 1960s.

References

External links 

Disused railway stations in West Yorkshire
Railway stations opened in 1857
Railway stations closed in 1954
1857 establishments in England
1966 disestablishments in England
Former Great Northern Railway stations
Railway stations in Great Britain opened in the 19th century